Heartland 66 Office Tower is a supertall skyscraper under construction in Wuhan, Hubei, China. It will be 320.9 meters tall. It has been under construction since 2015 and completed in 2020.

See also
List of tallest buildings in Wuhan
List of tallest buildings in China

References

Buildings and structures under construction in China
Skyscraper office buildings in Wuhan